Eugene Raymond III (March 16, 1916 – June 17, 2014) was an American politician who served in the New Jersey General Assembly from 1968 to 1974.

He died on June 17, 2014, at age 98.

References

1916 births
2014 deaths
Mayors of places in New Jersey
Republican Party members of the New Jersey General Assembly
People from Harvey Cedars, New Jersey
People from Pennsauken Township, New Jersey